The Seongsu Bridge, sometimes spelled Sŏngsu Bridge, is a cantilever bridge over the Han River, connecting the Seongdong and Gangnam districts of Seoul, South Korea. The bridge began construction under Hyundai Engineering & Construction on April 26, 1995 and was opened to the public on July 3, 1997 by Seoul Mayor Cho Soon. The original Seongsu Bridge was built in 1979, and was demolished and rebuilt following the Seongsu Bridge disaster on October 21, 1994.

History

Original bridge 

The original Seongsu Bridge was built by Dong Ah Construction Industrial Company, opening to the public on October 15, 1979. Fifteen years later, on the morning of October 21, 1994, a span of the Seongsu Bridge collapsed, killing 32 people and injuring 17 others. The collapse was ruled a result of poor welding, rusted extension hinges, and lack of general maintenance— and would result in the convictions of 16 city government and construction workers on charges of criminal negligence.

In the aftermath of the disaster, the Seoul Metropolitan Government originally planned to repair and reopen the bridge to traffic within three months, but reversed course after public outcry.

New bridge

See also
 List of Han River bridges
 Seongsu Bridge disaster
 House of Hummingbird

References

External links

 
Collapse of Seongsu Bridge

Cantilever bridges
Bridges in Seoul
Bridges completed in 1979
Bridge disasters in South Korea
Bridge disasters caused by construction error
Bridges completed in 1997
1994 in South Korea
Transport disasters in 1994